Antoine Everett (born November 16, 1991) is an American football offensive guard who is currently a free agent. He played college football at McNeese State.

Professional career

Tampa Bay Buccaneers 
Everett was signed as an undrafted rookie to the Tampa Bay Buccaneers on May 19, 2015. On August 30, he was waived. On September 30, he was signed to the Buccaneers' practice squad. On January 5, 2016, he was signed to a reserve/future contract.

Everett was waived on April 29, 2016.

Pittsburgh Steelers
On August 20, 2016, Everett was signed by the Steelers. On September 3, 2016, he was released by the Steelers as part of final roster cuts.

Baltimore Brigade
On March 13, 2019, Everett was assigned to the Baltimore Brigade. On April 24, 2019, Everett was placed on injured reserve.

References

External links
Tampa Bay Buccaneers bio
McNeese State Cowboys bio

Living people
American football offensive guards
Tampa Bay Buccaneers players
Pittsburgh Steelers players
Baltimore Brigade players
1991 births